A scenographer or production designer, develops the appearance of a stage design, a TV or movie set, a gaming environment, a trade fair exhibition design or a museum experience exhibition design. The term originated in theater. A scenographer works together with the theater director to make the message come through in the best way they think possible, the director having the leading role and responsibility particularly for dramatic aspects - such as casting, acting, and direction - and the scenographer primarily responsible for the visual aspects or "look" of the production - which often includes scenery or sets, lighting, and costumes, and may include projections or other aspects.

While a common role in theatrical production teams in most countries, the position of scenographer is very uncommon in the United States, where this task is generally parcelled out among several people, principally the scenic or set designer who generally spearheads the visual aspects of the production.  The production's design team often includes a production team that includes a director,  scenic or set designer, lighting designer, costume designer, sound designer, dramaturg, stage manager, and production manager.

See also
Scenography
Set construction
Show control
Sound design

References

External links
Master's Degree in Scenography and Contemporary Cities in Barcelona
What is Scenography Article illustrating the differences between US and European theatre design practices

 

de:Bühnenbildner
pt:Cenografia